Vasant Valley School is a co-educational private high school in Vasant Kunj, Delhi, India.

After its inception, the school accepted students in July 1990, up to grade 4. The school added a new grade each year as the classes graduated to the next level. 

The first graduating class of Vasant Valley completed 12 grades under the CBSE syllabus in May 1999. The school began with Arun Kapur as its Director, a former housemaster at The Doon School and an alumnus of St. Stephen's College, Delhi.

Notable alumni 

 Tanvi Hans - ex-player at Tottenham Hotspur L.F.C. and poster-girl for Gurinder Chadha's Bend It Like Beckham the Musical
 Roshni Nadar - Executive Director and CEO of HCL Technologies

References

Educational institutions established in 1990
Schools in Delhi
1990 establishments in Delhi